Mark Kaniela Saito Ing (born December 24, 1988) is an American politician and community organizer who was a member of the Hawaii House of Representatives from the 11th District, representing south Maui from November 7, 2012 until November 6, 2018. He unsuccessfully ran to represent Hawaii's 1st District in the U.S. House of Representatives in the 2018 federal election. Ing currently serves as Climate Justice Director for People’s Action where he leads national campaigns to combat climate change. He serves on various coalitions including the Green New Deal Network, the United National Frontline Table, Climate Power Advisory Board, and the Hawai’i Community Bail Fund’s board of directors.

Early life 

Ing was born and raised in Hawaii. Ing attended Kamehameha Schools Maui, Maui Community College, the University of Hawaii at Manoa, and American University in Washington D.C. Ing served as UH student-body president, as a neighborhood board member, and has worked in various capacities with Hawaii's business, government, and the non-profit sectors prior to assuming public office.

Ing's father died when Ing was a child. Ing worked as a harvester in the pineapple fields as a young teenager.

Hawaii State House of Representatives

Ing was elected to serve the 11th House District (South Maui: Kihei, Wailea, Makena) as a first-time candidate in 2012. Ing won the Democratic primary election, and overtook three opponents, carrying 43% of the vote. Ing then defeated Republican incumbent George Fontaine in the general election with 61% of the vote to the incumbent's 35%.

Ing was re-elected in the 2014 primary and general elections. In 2016, Ing faced Primary challenger, Deidre Tegarden, an aide to former Hawaii Governor Neil Abercrombie. Ing prevailed with 61% of the vote to his opponent's 34%.

Marriage equality and LGBT rights
In November 2013, then-Governor Neil Abercrombie convened a special election for the purpose of conducting public hearings to consider the adoption of a law that would legalize marriage for same-sex couples in Hawaii. Ing supported the legislation, delivering a speech during the final floor vote in the House in which he spoke about how the murder of Matthew Shepard impacted him as a young man and led to his eventual recognition of the need for equal rights for LGBT Americans despite his Christian background.

Same-day and automatic voter registration 
In 2013 and 2014, Ing introduced a bill to provide for a same-day voter registration law. With the support of Common Cause, the League of Women Voters, and Faith Action for Community Equity (FACE), the revised bill passed and was signed into law on July 1, 2014. The law has allowed voters to register and vote during a single visit at all early-polling places in Hawaii starting in 2016, and at all polling places on election day starting in 2018.

Mark Zuckerberg's quiet title action
In 2016, Facebook founder Mark Zuckerberg purchased 700-acres of beach front land on the island of Kauai. Zuckerberg initiated quiet title and adverse possession lawsuits against a number of Native Hawaiian families who held "Kuleana" land rights within his 700-acre Kauai property. Ing called for mediation and community outreach and quipped that "in Hawaii... we don't initiate conversation by filing a lawsuit against our neighbors." Ing argued that the legal mechanisms Zuckerberg attempted to use were predatory by nature as they have been used historically to "displace Native Hawaiians from their ancestral lands." Zuckerberg ultimately dropped the lawsuits and offered an apology.

2016 arrest 
In January 2016, Ing was cited for failure to produce proof of insurance for a vehicle he owned. On July 16, he failed to appear in court in this case and was subsequently arrested. A subsequent court date was scheduled.

Campaign spending violations 
On June 20, 2018, the Hawaii Campaign Spending Commission approved a $15,422 administrative fine based on allegations that Ing filed inaccurate reports during the period of 2011 to 2016.

One commissioner sought to refer the matter to criminal prosecution, the other four commissioners disagreed and voted that the violations were not criminal and did not require prosecution, stating "there are not enough good politicians" and that criminal prosecution would have been fatal to Ing's political career.

On July 20, 2018, Ing fired his accountant after determining his accountant inadvertently filed the wrong version of his campaign finance report on July 15. The original report, which was quickly corrected on July 16, identified a $262,830 cash balance. The corrected report corrected the balance to $100,847. The accountant confirmed his mistake in a subsequent release.

Campaign for Hawaii's first congressional district 

In November 2017, Ing announced his intention to run for Hawaii's 1st congressional district, where incumbent Congresswoman Colleen Hanabusa was retiring to challenge Governor David Ige in the Democratic primary for Governor of Hawaii. Ing's candidacy received widespread attention and support from the left, receiving the endorsement of the Democratic Socialists of America, Justice Democrats, Our Revolution, the Democratic nominee for New York's 14th congressional district Alexandria Ocasio-Cortez, California Congressman Ro Khanna and Washington Congresswoman Pramila Jayapal. He received attention for his campaign ads and his pledge for universal housing.

Ing finished fourth in the Democratic primary, won by former Congressman Ed Case. He drew 7,531 votes, or 6.3%.

See also
List of Democratic Socialists of America who have held office in the United States

References

External links 

1988 births
Living people
Democratic Socialists of America politicians from Hawaii
Democratic Party members of the Hawaii House of Representatives
University of Hawaiʻi at Mānoa alumni
American University alumni
21st-century American politicians
Hawaii politicians of Japanese descent
Hawaii politicians of Chinese descent
Native Hawaiian politicians
Maui Community College alumni